I'm a Lonely Wanderer is a studio album by Slim Whitman, released in 1963 on Imperial Records.

Track listing 
The album was issued in the United States and Canada by Imperial Records as a 12-inch long-playing record, catalog number LP 9226 (mono).

References 

1963 albums
Slim Whitman albums
Imperial Records albums